Lorene Jen  (born 22 November 1988), previously known as Kirsten Jen, is a Taiwanese actress, model and singer.  Her surname is sometimes spelled as Jen. She is the younger sister of Taiwanese girl group S.H.E member Selina Jen. Jen graduated from National Taiwan Normal University, with a bachelor's degree in home economics, human development and family studies.

Early life
Lorene Jen was born on 22 November 1988, in Taipei, Taiwan. Her father, Milton Jen, has ancestral home in Dazhou, Sichuan, used to be a technology company executive and now works as a part-time actor. Her mother is Zheng Ruilan, a homemaker. Jen is the youngest of a two child family. Her older sister is Taiwanese girl group S.H.E member Selina Jen.

Jen attended National Taiwan Normal University and graduated in 2011 with a bachelor's degree in home economics, human development and family studies.

Career

Pre-debut
In 2000, Taiwanese entertainment management agency HIM International Music held a "Universal 2000 Talent and Beauty Girl Contest" to search for new artistes. The winner of the contest would receive a contract from HIM. Jen wanted to participate and had registered in the contest, but was too young. Her older sister Selina entered the contest in her place and ended up winning the contest. For the next few years Jen would then sometimes appear on variety shows as her sister's guest, appear in other artistes' music videos and also appear in commercial advertisements before officially debuting in 2009.

Acting
Jen made her acting debut in 2009 starring as the lead actress in GTV's fantasy idol drama K.O.3an Guo, which is a spin-off of the popular KO One drama franchise. The drama took an entire year to film since it was split into 3 seasons with 53 episodes total. The drama helped her gain more exposure and soon she received more acting offers, usually starring as the lead or main cast.

Her most acclaimed work to date is 2013 SETTV political themed idol drama In a Good Way. The drama was praised for its original storyline. Jen played "Lin Jia En" (林嘉恩), a country girl who wanders into the big city for fun but ends up meeting and falling for "Liu Shan Feng" (劉杉峰), played by Lego Lee, the most popular guy at a college from a strong political family during the 90's in Taiwan, The drama received multi Golden Bell Awards nominations, including Best Drama at the 49th ceremony. The Pairing of Jen and Lee was also well received as the two won Best Screen Couple Award at the 2014 Sanlih Drama Awards.

Music
Jen occasionally contributes to the soundtracks of the dramas she starred in. She first sang as part of the chorus for Danson Tang's single "When Together (愛在一起)", featured in his 2007 album Love Me.

Filmography

Television series

Feature film

Short film

Music video

Awards and nominations

References

External links

 Lorene Jen at chinesemov.com
 Lorene Jen Facebook page 
 Lorene Jen Weibo page 
 Lorene Jen Instagram page 
 Lorene Jen International Fan Club page

1988 births
Living people
Taiwanese television actresses
Taiwanese film actresses
Taiwanese female models
21st-century Taiwanese actresses